This is a list of churches in the Anglican Diocese of Sydney.  This includes physical church buildings even if they do not currently have congregations meeting.  If a congregation meets in a shared space such as a school hall, it should only be listed if it is the primary meeting site for a parish.

See also
List of Anglican churches

References

External links

 
Anglican churches
Lists of churches in Australia
Churches
Anglicanism-related lists
Lists of buildings and structures in Sydney